Badnaam is a Pakistani drama serial that aired its first episode on 8 August 2017 on ARY Digital. The serial was directed by Mohsin Talat, written by Ghazala Naqvi and was produced by Humayun Saeed and Shahzad Nasib under Six Sigma Plus. It stars Zain Afzal, Sanam Chaudhry, Ali Kazmi, Ahson Talish and many others.

Cast

Main 
 Sanam Chaudhry as Minahil
 Ali Kazmi as Afraaz Yazdani
 Zain Afzal as Jawad

Recurring 
 Raeed Muhammad Alam as Mehroz
 Tabbasum Arif as Fahad's mother
 Shameen
 Naima Khan
 Ahson Talish
 Saba Faisal
 Behroze Sabswari
 Azra Mansoor
 Zhalay Sarhadi

References 

Pakistani drama television series
2017 Pakistani television series debuts
2018 Pakistani television series endings
Urdu-language television shows
ARY Digital original programming